Kaat Hannes (born 21 November 1991) is a Belgian former road cyclist, who rode professionally between 2011 and 2017, and also in 2020, for the , ,  and  teams. She participated at the 2012 UCI Road World Championships.

Major results

2008
 7th Road race, UEC European Junior Road Championships
2009
 6th Road race, UCI Junior World Championships
2011
 10th Gooik–Geraardsbergen–Gooik
2012
 4th Erondegemse Pijl
 6th Halle-Buizingen
 8th Omloop van het Hageland
 9th Le Samyn
2013
 9th Sparkassen Giro Bochum
 10th Road race, UEC European Under-23 Road Championships
2014
 8th Trofee Maarten Wynants
2015
 3rd  Team road race, Military World Games
 7th Diamond Tour
2016
 1st  Road race, National Road Championships
 5th 7-Dorpenomloop Aalburg
2017
 6th Trofee Maarten Wynants
2018
 1st Stage 5 Gracia–Orlová
 4th Flanders Ladies Classic
 6th Omloop van Borsele
 7th Road race, UEC European Road Championships
 8th 7-Dorpenomloop Aalburg
 10th Overall Belgium Tour
 10th Omloop van het Hageland
 10th Trofee Maarten Wynants
2019
 9th Diamond Tour

References

External links
 

1991 births
Belgian female cyclists
Living people
People from Herentals
Cyclists at the 2015 European Games
European Games competitors for Belgium
Cyclists from Antwerp Province
21st-century Belgian women